Microtubule-associated serine/threonine-protein kinase 2 is an enzyme that in humans is encoded by the MAST2 gene. The protein encoded by this gene  controls TRAF6 and NF-kappaB activity.

Interactions 

MAST2 has been shown to interact with PCLKC.

Model organisms 

Model organisms have been used in the study of MAST2 function. A conditional knockout mouse line called Mast2tm1a(KOMP)Wtsi has been generated. Male and female animals underwent a standardized phenotypic screen to determine the effects of deletion. Additional screens performed:  - In-depth immunological phenotyping

References

Further reading 

 
 
 
 
 
 
 
 
 
 
 
 
 
 
 

EC 2.7.11